A land-use conflict occurs when there are conflicting views on land-use policies, such as when an increasing population  creates competitive demands for the use of the land, causing  a negative impact on other land uses nearby.

Common types

Urban
It causes noise, air and water pollution. Apart from the noise and gases released by factories, pollution is also caused by the vehicles which carry materials to and from factories. This can cause incessant noises and smoke. Heavy road traffic also causes traffic congestion, affecting many nearby residents. In addition to factories, the presence of main roads also affects residents, causing the same problems listed above.

Urban planning was poor or non-existent in the past. Both residential and industrial areas require convenient transport. Labour-intensive industries need to seek workers easily. As a result, residential and industrial areas are often close neighbours.

In Hong Kong, particularly in the old urban areas, this type of conflict is a common sight. In downtown Los Angeles, however, the problem is opposite. Industrial facilities are being converted to residential use, and the Community Redevelopment Agency of Los Angeles believes that this trend will cause a loss of job opportunities for unskilled workers.

Suburban
Complaints about noise and odour emitted by agricultural land uses are rather common in places between the urban and rural areas and may cause the premature removal of land from agricultural use. Urban owners often complain that the odour or noise were not apparent at the time when the house was purchased. Producers argue that these differences occurred because of the weather conditions, and do not mean that they had changed what they were doing. Most farms have, in fact, in some ways reduced their odour. Moreover, spraying may cause a lot of noise, disturbing the nearby residents. As farmers often work at night-time or early in the morning, residents complain that the noise is disturbing their sleep.

Another major concern in such areas is the traffic. Heavy farming materials as well as materials for home construction are heavy and bulky, and therefore move somewhat slowly and cause traffic congestions. Crime in such fringes, particularly trespassing and vandalism, are also common, and affect both landowners and the producers.

Rural
Such conflicts are, however, not restricted to urban areas. For example, car repairing workshops and cargo container storages located near the residential suburbs can trigger land-use conflicts by raising the risk of fire and polluting the nearby environment. For example, oil from the car repairing workshops can cause water pollution.

Solutions
There are a number of possible methods to ease, avoid or eradicate land-use conflicts. The most common ones are listed below:
Urban planning
Urban planning is the planning of land uses. This helps to separate lands uses that do not complement each other. For example, a green belt may be used to separate residential areas from factories. 
Redevelopment
Redeveloping old urban areas by planning the land uses carefully so that land is used in a better way than before. This will improve the quality of the environment of that area. 
Restriction of land use
Sometimes, unauthorized changes in the land use of a particular area would be outlawed. In other words, the land use of a particular area must remain the one set by the government. Again using Hong Kong as an example, flats may not be used for commercial, industrial or other purposes. This prevents any ill effects a change in land use may cause. However, some places allow one land user to develop whereas denying such a right to others, causing wealth distribution problems to arise.
Development of new towns
New towns are towns in which the urban planning is better than that of old urban areas. In these towns, all factories are grouped into a certain place which is away from the residential blocks, often with green belts, so the pollution has a smaller chance of affecting the residents. Consequently, people would have both a good living environment and an ideal working environment. Again using Hong Kong as an example, only 1% of the land use in Sha Tin is mixed. 
Reclamation
Reclamation helps solve land-use conflicts indirectly by easing the demand for land and lowering the land price.
Tort law

See also
Urban planning
Land-use planning
Land use
Nuisance

References

Land use